Desperate for Marriage is a 2022 Russian romantic comedy-drama film written and directed by Sonya Karpunina. The action takes place in Kaliningrad, the plot is built around a successful TV channel presenter, whose life changes after a chance acquaintance, the film stars Miloš Biković, Kristina Asmus, Sergei Gilev, and Marina Alexandrova.

Desperate for Marriage was scheduled to be theatrically released on March 5, 2022, by Central Partnership.

Plot 
For the journalist named Lyuba, everything is going according to plan: the work of the presenter on the TV channel, the successful and wealthy fiance Robert. The plan goes to hell when Lyuba’s phone goes down, and she asks to call a random passerby from the phone. It turned out to be Sergei, who also had a calm and measured life until that day. This meeting will launch a series of events that will completely change the life of Lyuba, and Sergei, and themselves.

Cast

Production 
Sonya Karpunina is the director and her husband Klim Shipenko is the creative producer. He will also act as a producer of the film together with Alena Kremer and George Shabanov. 
The project is filmed by Peak Media film production in partnership with START Studio video service.

Miloš Biković also acts as a producer of the film, together with director Klim Shipenko, with whom they worked on the Serf (film).

Filming 
Principal photography began on June 1, 2021, will last until mid-summer and will be held in Moscow, and picturesque places in Kaliningrad, Russia. Some of the scenes were filmed at the Kaliningrad Oblast Museum of Fine Arts, in the nearby square, and on Uglovaya and Pugacheva streets.

Release

Marketing 
The first teaser trailer of Desperate for Marriage was released on January 18, 2022.

Theatrical 
The actors attended a special screening on March 4, in Svetlogorsk, Kaliningrad Oblast. It is scheduled to be theatrically released in the Russian Federation on March 5, 2022, by Central Partnership.

References

External links 
 

2022 films
2020s Russian-language films
2022 romantic comedy-drama films
Russian romantic comedy-drama films
Films about marriage
Films shot in Moscow
Films shot in Russia